is an airport located  east northeast Amami, a city on Amami Ōshima (Amami Island) in the Kagoshima Prefecture of Japan.

History
A new airport with a runway of 2000 meters to accept jet aircraft was opened on 10 July 1988, at which time the former airport was closed. The remnants of the old airport can still be seen via satellite images.

Airlines and destinations

Passenger

Statistics

References

External links

 Amami Airport (Kagoshima Prefecture) 
 Amami Airport Guide from Japan Airlines
 
 

Amami Islands
Airports in Kagoshima Prefecture
Airports established in 1988
1988 establishments in Japan